Pabellón Polideportivo Artaleku is an arena in Irun, Spain.  It is primarily used for team handball and is the home arena of CD Bidasoa.  The arena holds 2,200 people.

Handball venues in Spain
Indoor arenas in Spain
Sports venues in the Basque Country (autonomous community)